Prunus buergeriana, in Japanese イヌザクラ (inu-zakura), meaning dog cherry, is a species of bird cherry native to Japan, Korea, Taiwan, China, northeast India (Sikkim), and Bhutan. In China it prefers to grow on mountain slopes at 1000 to 3400m above sea level. Its closest relative is Prunus perulata, from which it is morphologically and genetically distinct.

Description

The small flowers are borne on a raceme. The fruit ripen from green through red to black.

Cultural significance
Considered an unlovely tree in Japan, the dog cherry is used as a simile in Japanese haiku for unflattering comparisons with dogs; in these the paltry raceme resembles the tail of a whipped cur, or the spotted bark the markings of a starving mongrel.

References

External links

buergeriana
Trees of Bhutan
Trees of China
Flora of Sikkim
Trees of Japan
Trees of Korea
Trees of Taiwan
Bird cherries
Plants described in 1865